Shaw's Cove Bridge is a swing bridge in New London, Connecticut built in 1984, replacing a similar bridge built in 1913. The span carries railroad tracks used by Amtrak for their train along the Northeast Corridor while allowing boat traffic to go through.

History

In 1891, a Pratt truss bridge was constructed to cross over the cove. The bridge was built over a center pier and end stone masonry piers. In 1913, the span was replaced with a  swing bridge span sitting on the original piers. The span was Pratt through truss of the rim-bearing type which has a circulator drum and rollers along the perimeter of the center pier. This type of mechanisms was an early design of swing bridge variants which was later replaced with center-bearing type. The bridge undergone substantial repairs in 1917, 1924, 1932, and 1938. The 1913 span was added to the National Register of Historic Places as an example of early type of swing bridges.

Replacement
In the 1980s, Federal Railroad Administration funded the $4 billion Northeast Corridor Improvement Project (NECIP) to fully electrify the Northeast Corridor between Washington, DC and Boston. As part of the project, Amtrak upgraded several portions of Northeast Corridor infrastructure in preparation for the launch of the Acela Express service. This included a replacement of the Shaw's Cove Bridge in 1984.

Current operations
During the winter months (December to March), Shaw's Cove Bridge is open on signal in certain hours when an eight-hour advanced notice is given for the marine traffic to pass. For the rest of the year, one-hour advanced notice is required.

The operations in winter can be challenging. Occasionally, the bridge would not close for several hours causing trains to be delayed due to mechanical issues caused by extreme cold temperature. Similar issues can cause the bridge not to be able to open for marine traffic for several days.

Gallery

References

External links

Railroad bridges in Connecticut
Historic American Engineering Record in Connecticut
New London, Connecticut
Bridges in New London County, Connecticut
Amtrak bridges
Steel bridges in the United States